Retinella stabilei is a species of snail in the family Zonitidae, the true glass snails. This species is endemic to Italy, where it lives in shady woodland habitat.

References

Retinella
Endemic fauna of Italy
Gastropods described in 1886
Taxonomy articles created by Polbot